The Madrid Ladies Masters was a professional golf tournament in Spain on the Ladies European Tour.  The 54-hole event was held at the par-73 Casino Club de Golf Retamares in early October and played for three years, from 2007 to 2009.

History
The 2009 event finished in a playoff between former college teammates at Arizona State, Azahara Muñoz of Spain and Anna Nordqvist of Sweden.  Both had exceptional final rounds and climbed to the top of the leaderboard after 54 holes.  On the first playoff hole, the par-5 18th, Muñoz rolled in a  putt for an eagle to win her first tournament as a professional. She had turned pro only weeks earlier and was playing on a sponsor's invitation; the win earned her €50,000 and a three-year exemption on the LET.

The purse was cut in half in 2009 and the event was left off of the schedule in 2010 and 2011.

Winners

References

External links

Ladies European Tour

Former Ladies European Tour events
Golf tournaments in Spain
Sports competitions in Madrid